"Along the Songhua River" is a patriotic song from the War of Resistance in both the Republic of China (now in Taiwan) and the People's Republic of China.

History
The song describes the lives of the people who had lost their homeland along the Songhua River, after the Mukden Incident of September 18, 1931 (「九.一八」) in Northeast China.  

It was written and composed by Zhang Hanhui.

Lyrics

References

External links
Listen on YouTube

Political party songs
Chinese patriotic songs